"Open Your Eyes" is a song by the Scottish-Northern Irish alternative rock band Snow Patrol. It has been released as the fifth single in total from the 2006 album Eyes Open. The song was released on 12 February 2007.

The song experienced particular success in Brazil, where it ended at number 21 on the country year-end airplay chart, published by Crowley Broadcast Analysis.

Music video
The song's music video is actual footage from the classic cult film C'était un rendez-vous by director Claude Lelouch. It marked the first time Lelouch granted permission to anyone to use footage from the movie. Q chose it as their Video of the Week on 6 February 2007.

In popular culture
The song was used as the theme music to BBC One's Football Focus. The song gained more popularity after being featured during the emotional season twelve finale of ER. Sales of the song on iTunes rose as the song was later featured in a third season episode of The 4400, an episode of Grey's Anatomys third season, the pilot episode of The Black Donnellys, season 4 episode 21 of Brothers and Sisters, and the second season finale of Being Erica.

It was additionally used in the 2008 Penn State IFC/Panhellenic Dance Marathon video entitled "Don't Waste One Minute"; in the trailer for the 2008 MTV film Stop-Loss; in a promo for season two of Gossip Girl; as the soundtrack to the "best bits" of the British reality series Celebrity Big Brother 5; and as the theme for Barack Obama's 2008 presidential campaign, being played at many rallies. The song is used as the background music to the advert for the BBC High Definition service and was heavily featured in the BBC series The Real Swiss Family Robinson, where privileged families were sent to deserted islands to try and survive for three weeks. The song was used in mini movies about children living in Africa suffering from cataracts, which was made for Comic Relief. It was also featured in the 2007 film The Invisible along with "You're All I Have" and was later used in the final moments of the 2013 Formula 1 documentary film 1: Life on the Limit.

In 2013, the song was featured in the second to last episode, A.A.R.M. of the final season of The Office.

Track listingUK CD/7-inch/Digital download "Open Your Eyes" – 5:41
 "I Am an Astronaut" – 2:42

 "I Am an Astronaut" was previously featured on the Save the Children compilation album Colours Are Brighter.Australian CD "Open Your Eyes" – 5:41
 "I Am an Astronaut" – 2:42
 "You're All I Have" (live in Hamburg) – 4:42
 "Open Your Eyes" (music video)
 "Shut Your Eyes" (music video)CD promo "Open Your Eyes" (radio edit) – 3:56
 "Open Your Eyes"  – 5:4112-inch promo "Open Your Eyes" (Allende Remix) – 7:29
 "Chasing Cars" (Topher Jones & Blake Jarrell Remix) – 7:35Unofficial releases'''
 "Open Your Eyes" (Marky and Bungle Remix) – 5:43
 "Open Your Eyes" (Tiësto Remix) (Private / Unreleased Remix)
 "Open Your Eyes" (Redanka Mix) – 8:08
 "Open Your Eyes" (Walker Remix) – 6:26

Reception
Yahoo! Music's Adam Webb had mixed reviews for the single. He rated it five stars out of ten and criticized them for "making the same record over and over again", though he stated "Set the Fire to the Third Bar" an exception. He called the song "a return to the formula of "Run", "Chasing Cars" and so on and so forth." He criticized the song further by saying that it sounded like "five young men caught in the headlights as Gary Lightbody sings about aching bones and cold skin over a clipped guitar riff, before everything explodes in an orgy of significance and strait-laced posturing. By the end, the boys in the band are furiously hammering away, heads down, no nonsense, wham bam thank you mam."The Irish Times columnist Brian Boyd derided Snow Patrol as "life-support machine music" due to the overuse of their songs on medical dramas such as Grey's Anatomy. Q'' called the single "genuinely good".

Charts

Weekly charts

Year-end charts

Certifications

References

2000s ballads
2005 songs
2007 singles
Interscope Records singles
Music videos directed by Robert Hales
Rock ballads
Snow Patrol songs
Song recordings produced by Jacknife Lee
Songs written by Gary Lightbody
Songs written by Jonny Quinn
Songs written by Nathan Connolly
Songs written by Paul Wilson (musician)
Songs written by Tom Simpson (musician)